Ega aequatoria is a species of ground beetle in the family Carabidae. It is found in Colombia.

References

Carabidae
Beetles described in 1850
Beetles of South America